Sangrai  is a village in Amritsar District of Punjab State, India. The village is administrated by a Sarpanch who is an[elected representative]].

Dhilwan, Batala, Nadala, Rayya-6 and Kapurthala are nearest Taluks  and Kapurthala, Kartarpur, Jalandhar, Qadian are the nearby cities to Sangrai. Kapurthala, Jalandhar, Tarn Taran and Amritsar are the nearby District Headquarters to the village.

Transport

Train
Dhilwan, Beas Junction, Hamira, and Baba Bakalaraya are the nearest railway stations to Sangrai however, Jalandhar City major railway station is 34  km away from the village.

Air
Raja Sansi airport, Pathankot airport, Ludhiana airport and Gaggal airport nearest airports are available to Sangrai village.

Air travel connectivity 
The closest airport to the village is Sri Guru Ram Dass Jee International Airport.

Villages in Kapurthala

References

External links
  Villages in Kapurthala
 Kapurthala Villages List

Villages in Kapurthala district